Gladys Noel Bates (born March 26, 1920, McComb, Mississippi, died October 15, 2010, Denver, Colorado) was an African-American civil rights pioneer, and educator who filed a lawsuit, Gladys Noel Bates vs the State of Mississippi, in 1948 charging salary discrimination against black teachers and principals. Although her lawsuit was not successful, it brought enough attention to the issue of wage equality in education to begin to equalize salaries.

Lawsuit
The “Gladys Noel Bates Teacher-Equalization Pay Suit” was the first civil rights suit filed in the history of the State of Mississippi. This landmark lawsuit was the forerunner for school desegregation cases of the 1950s.

Background
In 1948, salaries for black teachers in Mississippi was on the bottom rung of the nation’s teacher pay scale. Black teachers were paid one-half the salary of white teachers. In some school districts, the ratio was even lower. The difference in pay was based solely on skin color, even when black and white teachers had equal education, experience and Teacher certification. The Black teachers’ organization in Jackson, Mississippi was the Mississippi Association of Teachers in Colored Schools (MATCS). It later became known as the Mississippi Teachers Association (MTA). MATCS talked quietly with the NAACP leaders about the possibility of filing a lawsuit for equal pay for Black teachers. After many secret discussions, it was decided that the logical choice for a plaintiff would be Gladys Noel Bates because she was both a teacher and an active officer of the Jackson NAACP.

Preparation
During the long months of preparation for the lawsuit, all of the parties involved were pledged to absolute silence for they realized a slip of the tongue could result in Mrs. Bates being fired before the suit was filed.

The chief counsel for the NAACP at that time was a young attorney by the name of Thurgood Marshall. Attorney Marshall came and met with the small group of MATCS and NAACP representatives in Jackson. Attorney Marshall told the group, point blank, that until they secured $5,000, they were not in a position to seriously consider filing a lawsuit. This was quite a bit of money in the 1940s. It would be especially difficult for this group to raise that amount.

Fundraising
In addition to the money needed to file, no public school employee wanted to have in his possession any incriminating evidence which linked him to the suit. Mrs. Bates was often cautioned to keep papers in a safe place so that names of school and association personnel would not be placed in jeopardy.

The teachers decided to raise money for the lawsuit by increasing their membership dues by one dollar. They called this new fund the welfare or benevolent fund. Teachers, when asked by their white superintendents why the increase in dues was necessary, gave the well rehearsed reply that this money was needed for flowers and memorials for illnesses and deaths of black teachers. This was yet another survival tactic used by the African-American teachers during those years.

The other problem that MATCS and the NAACP faced was how to bank these so-called “welfare” funds. This also had to be done in full secrecy. MATCS opened an account under an assumed name at the Tri-State Bank in Memphis, Tennessee. All litigation expenses connected with the lawsuit were paid from this account.

Additional monies were secured at MATCS meetings by passing a gunny sack around the room. All teachers at the meetings would put their clenched fists inside the sack whether they had money in their hands or not. This was to protect members in case a snitch was in their presence. The snitch would not be able to disclose who had or had not contributed money to the case.

Final preparations
The next effort was to secure a local attorney to fight the case. For a time this seemed a serious roadblock. The only hope was an elderly man in Meridian, Mississippi, Attorney James A. Burns. He was very frail and it was seriously doubted that his health would permit his undertaking this strenuous physical and emotional case. To Mrs. Bates’ great relief, he replied that he felt taking on this case was the right thing for him to do. He agreed to become the attorney for the Bates’ lawsuit.

Attorney Burns climbed a bus every week to come to Jackson, Mississippi to file papers and research State and municipal records for little more than bus fare and meals. He was paid $1500 for four years of yeoman service to the cause of civil rights.

Filing and consequences 

The lawsuit was filed on March 4, 1948. Mrs. Bates and her husband were fired from their teaching positions by the end of the 1948 school year. The Bates’ along with her parents and a few teachers who had expressed favorable opinions about the suit, were ostracized from society and fired from their teaching positions as well.

Mr. and Mrs. Bates were not only fired but Blacklisted from all public school teaching positions in the state of Mississippi. Gunshots were fired through the windows of the Bates’ home and it was ultimately burned to the ground in 1949.

Results

Legal results
This lawsuit was in litigation for four years (1948–1951) and, finally, the United States Supreme Court refused to hear the case, not because it was unmerited, but, relying on the precedent set by the Cook vs Davis Supreme Court case, it had ruled that all administrative remedies had to be exhausted before the case could be heard by the Court. The plaintiff must first seek relief from the local school board; if not given, then relief should be sought from the county board of education. If no relief is given there, then redress should be sought from the State. The obvious flaw and futility of this gesture is that a plaintiff would never survive the first step before employment would be terminated, as was the case with Mrs. Bates and her husband.

Long-term results
Black teachers did win a moral victory, and, in reality, equalization of their salaries. After litigation was begun, month by month and year by year as the lawsuit was winding its way through the District and Appeals courts, Black teachers’ salaries were brought to parity with those of white teachers in the State of Mississippi. So, by 1951, equal salaries were a reality and the lawsuit became moot.

Personal life

Mrs. Bates was born to Andrew J. Noel, Sr. (1883–1960) and Hallie Sue Davis Noel (1893–1985). Both parents instilled the importance of duty to God, family and community in their five children. In addition, they emphasized the importance of higher education. Her father obtained his college education by selling his inheritance (land) and putting himself through college. Her mother was a graduate of the University of Chicago.

Bates was reared and educated in Jackson, Mississippi. Bates attended Alcorn A&M College in 1937-39.  She received her B.A. from Tougaloo College (1939–1942) and a master's degree from West Virginia State University (1952). She further studied at the University of Colorado, Denver.

In 1938, John M. Bates (1913–1995) and Gladys Winnie Noel were married. From this union two children were born, Kathryn Sue Bates (1939) and John Milton (“Bunky”) Bates, Jr. (1945–2005).

Prior to their marriage, John Bates, Sr. attended schools in Fairmont, West Virginia and was graduated from West Virginia State College. He joined the coaching staff of Alcorn A&M in Alcorn, Mississippi in 1937. In 1979, John earned his doctorate in education from the University of Colorado.

While visiting relatives in Denver in 1960, John and Gladys applied to the Denver Public Schools for teaching positions and were hired.

The Bates’ have received community recognition in the form of some of the most prestigious awards presented for community service. Dr. Bates was the only person to head both the North East Park Hill Civic Association and its successor organization, The Greater Park Hill Community, Inc. organization.;

The John M. and Gladys N. Bates Award recognizes an individual contributions in the areas of human relations, multiculturalism and the field of education.

The Mrs. Bates are nationally recognized and valued participants in community activities to enhance: educational opportunities, graffiti removal, gang interdiction, confronting drug abuse, encouraging strong interracial community relationships, creating jobs and economic opportunity, and mentoring emerging leaders of the community, they advocated using all of the community tools available.

Bates died October 15, 2010.

Accomplishments

 Assistant Principal for Pupil Services, Denver Public Schools
 Dean of Girls, Denver Public Schools
 teacher, Denver Public Schools
 assistant executive secretary, Mississippi Teachers Association
 secretary, Mississippi District YWCA
 bookkeeper, Mary Potter Academy, Oxford, North Carolina
 teacher, Jackson, Mississippi Public Schools
 Life member National Education Association (NEA)
 member, Colorado Education Association
 National Association for Women Deans, Administrators & Counselors, Denver Colorado
 Denver Administrators and Supervisors Association
 Colorado-Wyoming Association for Women Deans, Administrators and Counselors
 treasurer, Denver Association of Secondary Women in Administration
 past member, Board of Trustees, Tougaloo College
 past president, National Alumni Association, Tougaloo College
 member, Delta Sigma Theta
 past president, Denver Chapter of Links, Inc.
 past member, board of directors, NAACP
 precinct committeewoman and delegate to many Democratic County and State Conventions
 Recipient of National Education Association Human Relation Award, 1974
 Who’s Who of American Women, 1958–59; Who's Who of Black Americans, 1975–1976
 Merit Award, Mississippi Teachers Association
 Achievement Award, Alpha Phi Alpha
 Finer Womanhood Award, Zeta Phi Beta
 Pioneer Citation, Delta Sigma Theta
 Testimonial Banquet and Award, Citizens Commission of Jackson, Mississippi
 Plaque of Appreciation, Tougaloo National Alumni Association, 1966
 Teacher of the Year, Denver Blade Newspaper, 1964
 President’s Award at the National Conference of Black Mayors, Inc., 2002
 William Funk Community Service Award
 Founding Chair-person of the Greater Park Hill Community's Safe Neighborhood Committee Coalition Against Drugs
 Who's Who in Black Women
 Juanita R. Gray Award for Excellence in Education
 Black women's Political Action Forum (Mississippi)
 Colorado Association of Non-Profit Organizations (CANPO), Building Community Award, 1996 Mayor Wellington Webb of Denver, Colorado declared October 17, 1996, "Gladys Noel Bates Day".

Community involvement

Mrs. Bates and her husband were members of organizations committed to the betterment of the community. Organizations that have benefited from their leadership, dedication, and active participation include: Northeast Park Hill Civic Association, East Denver Optimists, Denver Area Council Boy Scouts, East Denver YMCA, NAACP, Omega Psi Phi fraternity, Delta Sigma Theta sorority, Shorter Community AME Church, CORE, Urban League, Denver Class Room Teachers Association, Colorado Education Association, Park Hill Action Committee, and Greater park Hill Community, Inc.

References

1920 births
2010 deaths
American educators
African-American educators
Alcorn State University alumni
Tougaloo College alumni
West Virginia State University alumni
University of Colorado Denver alumni
20th-century African-American people